The Black Sheep is a 1920 British silent romance film directed by Sidney Morgan and starring Marguerite Blanche, George Keene, Eve Balfour, and Arthur Lennard.

Cast
 Marguerite Blanche as Nora Ackroyd  
 George Keene as George Laxton 
 Eve Balfour as Laurie Fenton 
 George Bellamy as Mr. Ackroyd 
 Arthur Lennard as Mr. Fenton

References

Bibliography
 Low, Rachael. The History of the British Film 1918-1929. George Allen & Unwin, 1971.

External links
 

1920 films
British romantic drama films
British silent feature films
Films directed by Sidney Morgan
1920 romantic drama films
Films set in England
British black-and-white films
1920s English-language films
1920s British films
Silent romantic drama films